Téteghem (Dutch and ) is a former commune in the Nord department, northern France. On 1 January 2016, it was merged into the new commune Téteghem-Coudekerque-Village.

History

Téteghem is one of the communes with a name ending on "-hem". This suffix meaning house, dwelling or village became -Ghem. Tete- would come from a personal name; Tatto, perhaps, Theodore or Theodoric, personified by the giant of the town. Maybe this was the residence of Theodoric of Haverskerque. In the tenth and eleventh centuries, the territory depends on the powerful châtellerie Bergues until the annexation of territory with the acquisition of Flanders to the English by Louis XIV in 1662. Téteghem went down the sea, its area of 1924 hectares of which must be removed from the territory of Rosendal become Rosendaël in 1860 and the Place of Uxem, attached to Uxem in 1996. The area increased to 1884 ha.

In the Second World War, Téteghem formed part of the perimeter defences during the Battle of Dunkirk in 1940.

Heraldry

See also
Communes of the Nord department

References

Former communes of Nord (French department)
French Flanders